Dolichognatha comorensis is a species of long-jawed orb weaver in the spider family Tetragnathidae. It is found in Comoros.

References

Tetragnathidae
Spiders described in 1993